Shira is a Local Government Area of Bauchi State, Nigeria. Its headquarters is in the town of Yana.
 
It has an area of 1,321 km and a population of 234,014 at the 2006 census.

The postal code of the area is 750.

References

Local Government Areas in Bauchi State